Smithville was a village in Eastampton Township, Burlington County, New Jersey. It was originally established as Shreveville in 1831 by Jonathan and Samuel Shreve as a textile village on the Rancocas Creek. It was purchased by Hezekiah Bradley Smith in 1865 and renamed to Smithville. The Smithville post office was established in 1866. The H. B. Smith Machine Company, which produced the American Star Bicycle beginning in 1880, was located there. In 1962, the Smithville Post Office was closed. In 1975, Burlington County purchased the property and created the first park in the county. It is listed on the National and New Jersey Registers of Historic Places as the Smithville Historic District.

Bicycle railroad

In 1892, Arthur Hotchkiss received a patent for a bicycle railroad and contracted with the Smith Machine Company to manufacture it. The initial track ran  from Smithville, in a nearly straight line, crossing the Rancocas Creek ten times, and arrived at Pine Street, Mount Holly. It was completed in time for the Mount Holly Fair in September 1892, and the purpose of the railway was supposed to have been enabling employees to commute quickly from Mount Holly to the factory at Smithville. Monthly commuter tickets cost $2.00. The record speed on the railway was 4.5 minutes, and the average trip took 6–7 minutes. The railway was exhibited at the World's Columbian Exposition in 1893. It only had one track so that it was impossible to pass another rider, and if riders traveling in opposite directions met, one had to pull off onto a siding.
By 1897 ridership had declined, and the railway fell into disrepair.

Notable people

People who were born in, residents of, or otherwise closely associated with Smithville include:
 Charles R. Chickering (1891-1970), freelance artist who designed 77 U.S. postage stamps while working at the Bureau of Engraving and Printing

References

External links
Burlington County Parks Department

Company towns in New Jersey
Historic districts in New Jersey
Historic sites in New Jersey
Eastampton Township, New Jersey